Kahiwa Falls is a tiered waterfall in Hawaii located on the northern shore of the island of Molokai, between Wailau and Papalaua valleys.

The falls have 6 tiers, the highest drop is 183 m tall. Kahiwa Falls can be observed only from the sea or from air. At strong winds the waterfall may get caught and rise upwards.

Often the nearby Papalaua Falls are mistaken for Kahiwa Falls. Kahiwa Falls can easily be distinguished from Papalaua Falls – the latter are located at the far end of a 0.9 km-long valley, while Kahiwa Falls fall directly into the ocean.

References

Waterfalls of Hawaii
Landforms of Molokai